Jason Shiga (born	1976) is an American cartoonist who incorporates puzzles, mysteries and unconventional narrative techniques into his work.

Early life
Jason Shiga is from Oakland, California. His father, Seiji Shiga, was an animator who worked on the 1964 Rankin-Bass production Rudolph the Red-Nosed Reindeer. Jason Shiga was a pure mathematics major at the University of California at Berkeley, from which he graduated in 1998.

Career
Shiga is credited as the "Maze Specialist" for Issue #18 (Winter 2005/2006) of the literary journal McSweeney's Quarterly, which features a solved maze on the front cover and a (slightly different) unsolved maze on the back. The title page of each story in the journal is headed by a maze segment labeled with numbers leading to the first pages of other stories.

Shiga has also drawn and written several comics and illustrated features for Nickelodeon Magazine, some of which feature his original creations, and some starring Nickelodeon characters such as SpongeBob SquarePants and the Fairly OddParents.

Shiga makes a cameo appearance in the Derek Kirk Kim comic Ungrateful Appreciation as a Rubik's Cube-solving nerd.

Techniques and materials
According to the rear credits page of Empire State: A Love Story, Shiga, who was inspired by an actual Greyhound Bus trip from Oakland to New York to create that story, pencilled it with a yellow No. 2 pencil on copy paper. He then inked it with a lightbox and a 222 size Winsor & Newton brush, and lettered it with a Micron 08 felt-tip pen. The colors were applied digitally by John Pham.

Awards

Won
 2019 Gran Guinigi winner: Best Series, Demon.
 2017 Eisner Comic Industry Award winner: Best Graphic Album-Reprint, Demon
 2014 Ignatz Award winner: Outstanding Series, Demon.
 2007 Stumptown Comics Award winner: Best Writing, Bookhunter.
 2003 Ignatz Award winner: Outstanding Story, Fleep.
 2003 Eisner Comic Industry Award winner: Talent Deserving of Wider Recognition.
 1999 Xeric Award winner: Double Happiness.

Nominated
 2018 Angouleme Festival Sélection Officielle, Demon.
 2018 Angouleme Festival Prix du Public, Demon.
 2016 Los Angeles Times Book Prize nominee: Graphic Novel/Comics, Demon.
 2016 Ignatz Award nominee: Outstanding Series, Demon.
 2014 Ignatz Award nominee: Outstanding Webcomic, Demon.
 2012 Harvey Award nominee: Best Letterer, Best Inker, Best Writer, Best Artist, Empire State.
 2011 Harvey Award nominee: Best Original Graphic Publication for Younger Readers, Meanwhile.
 2007 Eisner Comic Industry Award nominee: Best Graphic Album, Bookhunter.
 2007 Ignatz Award nominee: Outstanding Graphic Novel, Bookhunter.
 2004 Eisner Comic Industry Award nominee: Best Single Issue or One-Shot, Fleep.

Bibliography

Books
Double Happiness, 2000 Shigabooks
Fleep, 2002 Sparkplug Comics
Bookhunter, 2007 Sparkplug Comics (French translation, éditions Cambourakis, 2008)
Meanwhile, 2010 Amulet Books (French translation as Vanille ou chocolat, éditions Cambourakis, 2012)
Empire State - A Love Story (or Not), 2011 Abrams
Demon, Volume 1, 2016 First Second
Demon, Volume 2, 2017 First Second
Demon, Volume 3, 2017 First Second
Demon, Volume 4, 2017 First Second
Adventuregame Comics: Leviathan, 2022 Amulet Books (French translation as Leviathan, éditions Cambourakis, 2022), ISBN 978-1-4197-5779-2

Self-published minicomics
Phillip's Head, 1997
The Adventures of Doorknob Bob, 1997
Mortimer Mouse, 1997
The Family Circus (parody), 1997
The Last Supper, 1997
Grave of the Crickets, 1998
The Bum's Rush, 1998
The Date, 1999
Meanwhile..., 2001
Hello World, 2003
Bus Stop, 2004
Knock Knock, 2006

References

External links
 
 Fleep, the collected comic
 Time article on Jason, web exclusive
 Asian Week Article (February 2001)
 Comixpedia

1976 births
Alternative cartoonists
American bloggers
American webcomic creators
Artists from Oakland, California
University of California, Berkeley alumni
Living people
Eisner Award winners for Talent Deserving of Wider Recognition
American people of Japanese descent
Ignatz Award winners
Date of birth missing (living people)